The 1987 Korfball World Championship was the 3rd edition of the major international korfball competition. It was held in the Netherlands on April 20–25, in the cities of Amsterdam, Bennekom, Dordrecht, Papendrecht, Rotterdam and Wormer. In a close final, Netherlands defeated Belgium by 9–7.

Pool matches
Legend

* Chinese Taipei, West Germany and USA have held an additional penalty shoot-out to determine second, third and fourth position.

Final round

11th–12th places

9th–10th places

7th–8th places

5th–6th places

Bronze medal match

Final

Final standings

See also
Korfball World Championship
International Korfball Federation

External links
International Korfball Federation

References
History of the IKF and the IKF World Championship

Korfball World Championship
Korfball World Championship
IKF World Korfball Championship
International sports competitions hosted by the Netherlands
Korfball in the Netherlands